Gymnocalycium uruguayense is a species of Gymnocalycium from Brazil and Uruguay.

Description 
Gymnocalycium uruguayense is a type of thin cactus. This cactus has a rounded, bulbous body which is low to the ground.

References

External links
 
 

uruguayense
Flora of Uruguay
Plants described in 1922